Julio Alejandro (27 November 1906 – 22 September 1995) was a Spanish screenwriter. He wrote for 80 films between 1951 and 1984. He wrote for the film Ash Wednesday, which was entered into the 8th Berlin International Film Festival.

Selected filmography
 Women Without Tomorrow (1951)
 Women Who Work (1953)
 Seven Women (1953)
 The Price of Living (1954)
 Ash Wednesday (1958)
 Nazarín (1959)
 My Mother Is Guilty (1960)
 Dangers of Youth (1960)
 Viridiana (1961)
 El tejedor de milagros (1962)
 Simon of the Desert (1965)
 Tristana (1970)
 The Garden of Aunt Isabel (1971)

References

External links

1906 births
1995 deaths
Spanish male screenwriters
Spanish male writers
People from Huesca
20th-century screenwriters